Just the Two of Us is a collaborative album by Canadian singer Matt Dusk and Polish singer Margaret. It consists of their interpretations of jazz standards. Dusk handled its production, and Margaret and Shelly Berger co-produced it. The album was recorded in Canada and Poland. It was released on 6 November 2015, through Magic Records, only in Poland. Its limited edition was released the same day exclusively to Empik. On 21 January 2016, it was released on a 12-inch vinyl with altered tracklist.

The album spawned two singles: "'Deed I Do" and "Just the Two of Us". It reached number 28 on the Polish Albums Chart, and was certified platinum by the Polish Society of the Phonographic Industry (ZPAV).

Track listing

Accolades

Charts

Certifications

Release history

References

2015 albums
Matt Dusk albums
Margaret (singer) albums
Vocal duet albums